Larry P. Courville (born April 2, 1975) is a Canadian professional ice hockey coach and former player. Over the course of his career, Courville spent parts of three seasons in the National Hockey League (NHL). From 2009 to 2017, he served as head coach of the Reading Royals of the ECHL.

Born in Timmins, Ontario, Courville was originally drafted by the Winnipeg Jets in the fifth round (119th overall) of the 1993 NHL Entry Draft. He had an excellent final OHL season in 1994–95 in which he scored 73 points and was a key component of Canada's gold medal-winning team at the 1995 World Junior Championships, but was unable to come to contract terms with Winnipeg. As a result, he re-entered the draft and was selected 61st overall by the Vancouver Canucks in the 1995 NHL draft.

Courville had a fine first professional season the following year with Vancouver AHL affiliate in Syracuse, scoring 49 points and earning a 3-game call-up to the Canucks, where he scored his first NHL goal. Over the next two seasons, he would continue to be a frequent call-up, seeing 30 more games in the NHL with Vancouver. However, he struggled to produce recording just 2 assists.

After spending four seasons in the Canuck organization, Courville was released in 1999 and signed with the San Jose Sharks. Courville's grit and leadership proved a valuable asset to the Sharks' farm team in Kentucky, but he failed to see any action with the Sharks in two seasons with the organization.

Since leaving the San Jose organization, Courville has played in the minor leagues.  He was possibly the biggest name player in the short-lived North Eastern Hockey League, playing for the York IceCats in the 2003–04 season.  After spending three seasons with the Reading Royals, Courville retired.

He was named interim head coach for the Royals on January 6, 2009, replacing Jason Nobili and returned as head coach for the 2009–10 season. During the 2016–17 season, he announced he would be stepping down from his position with the Royals. However, after qualifying for the playoffs, the Royals fired Courville on April 3, 2017. He is now the hockey director of the Lancaster Firebirds youth hockey.

Career statistics

References

External links

1975 births
Living people
 Canadian ice hockey left wingers
Cincinnati Mighty Ducks players
Cornwall Royals (OHL) players
Franco-Ontarian people
Hershey Bears players
Ice hockey people from Ontario
Johnstown Chiefs players
Kentucky Thoroughblades players
Moncton Hawks players
Newmarket Royals players
Oshawa Generals players
Reading Royals players
Sarnia Sting players
Sportspeople from Timmins
Syracuse Crunch players
Winnipeg Jets (1979–1996) draft picks
Vancouver Canucks draft picks
Vancouver Canucks players
York IceCats players
Canadian expatriate ice hockey players in the United States